Pyotr Antonovich Zalutsky (Russian: Пётр Антонович Залутский) (February 1887 – January 10, 1937) was a Russian Bolshevik revolutionary and Communist Party organiser, who was executed for his involvement in the United Opposition.

Early career 
Pyotr Zalutsky was the son of a peasant, born in Krucha, in the Mogilev province of Belarus. He joined the revolutionary movement as a teenager in 1904, took part in the 1905 revolution, and joined the Russian Social Democratic Labour Party in 1907. He worked for the party, illegally, in Vladivostok, before moving to St. Petersburg in 1911, where he worked in a factory, and, as a member of the Petersburg Bolshevik organisation he helped organise distribution of the illegal newspapers, Pravda and Zvezda.

At the time of the February Revolution, Zalutsky was a member of the three-man executive of the Petrograd (St Petersburg) committee of the Bolshevik organisation, along with Alexander Shliapnikov and Vyacheslav Molotov. As the most senior Bolsheviks at liberty in the capital, they ran the party until more senior figures returned from exile in Siberia or abroad, and set at one of radical hostility to the Provisional Government which took power after the Tsar had been overthrown. They were overruled when Stalin and Lev Kamenev returned from Siberia in March, but when Lenin arrived from Europe, in April, he backed the hard line that Zalutsky had taken.

Zalutsky was a political commissar with the Red Army during the Russian Civil War. In 1921, he was appointed secretary of the Petrograd committee of the Communist Party of the Soviet Union (CPSU), and in 1923 was elected to the Central Committee.

United Opposition 
Zalutsky was a political ally of Grigory Zinoviev, the Leningrad party boss who was a member of the triumvirate who assumed control while Lenin was terminally ill, in 1923. The triumvirate was at first united in its hostility to Leon Trotsky and the Left Opposition within the party. In 1924, Zalutsky wrote a pamphlet which called for Trotsky to be expelled from the CPSU, a position which even Stalin opposed at the time as too extreme.

But during 1925, the triumvirate split, as Zinoviev and Kamenev opposed what they regarded as Stalin's turn to the right, and formed the United Opposition with Trotsky. In October 1925, a party member named Leonov, who may have been working secretly for the Stalin faction, claimed to have been shocked to hear Zalutsky denounce the communist party leadership in private conversation for "creating a bourgeois state" and a "kingdom of peasant narrow-mindedness", treating Leningrad as a 'province', and working to bring about a "Thermidor", while likening Stalin to August Bebel, the German Marxist who tried to take a middle position between communists and social democrats. This case was referred to the Central Control Commission, and the Leningrad party committee received orders from Moscow to remove Zalutsky from his position as the provincial party secretary. He was removed from the Central Committee at the CPSU party congress in December 1925. He was expelled from the CPSU, with other members of the United Opposition, in December 1927, but in June 1928, he joined other members of the former Zinoviev faction in submitting to the party line in order to have his party membership restored.

Arrest and death 
In 1928-34, Zalutsky worked for the economic council for the Lower Volga, but was arrested, with Zinoviev and others, in December 1934, days after the assassination of the Leningrad party boss, Sergei Kirov, but near the end of that month it was announced that there was insufficient evidence to charge him, and that he would be sent into administrative exile. In fact, he was tried in secret on 16 January, accused of belonging to the so-called 'Leningrad Counter-revolutionary group of Safarov and others, and sentenced to five years in prison. Though his name was not mentioned when Zinoviev, Kamenev went on trial, in the first of the Moscow show trials in August 1936, he was rearrested in September, and sentenced to death at a secret hearing on January 10, 1937.

The criminal case against Zalutsky was overturned in the 1960s. On 12 August 1987, Pravda announced that his party membership had been posthumously restored.

References 

1887 births
1937 deaths
Russian revolutionaries
Russian Social Democratic Labour Party members
Soviet military personnel of the Russian Civil War
People executed by the Soviet Union by firearm
Executed politicians
Central Committee of the Communist Party of the Soviet Union members
Members of the Orgburo of the Central Committee of the Communist Party of the Soviet Union
People of the Russian Revolution
Old Bolsheviks